Arasada may refer to:

 Arasada (moth), a genus of moths of the family Noctuidae
 Arasada, Vizianagaram district, a village in Balijipeta mandal of Vizianagaram district